Ronald D. Liebowitz (born April 26, 1957) is the ninth President of Brandeis University succeeding Frederick M. Lawrence. Formerly Middlebury College's 16th President, and a professor of geography, succeeding John McCardell, Jr. on July 1, 2004. On December 17, 2015, it was announced that Liebowitz would become the ninth president of Brandeis University.

Liebowitz had previously served as provost and Dean of the Faculty at Middlebury College. An expert in Russian economic and political geography, he began teaching at Middlebury in 1984.  His first Middlebury experience was as a Language School student in 1980 and 1981.

A native of Brooklyn, Liebowitz received his undergraduate degree from Bucknell University in 1979 and completed his postgraduate work at  Columbia University. He received his Ph.D. in geography in 1985. Liebowitz and his wife, Jessica, have three children.

Presidency

Liebowitz was Middlebury's third faculty member to become president, following McCardell and 19th century alumnus Ezra Brainerd. In his first year, he shaped the agreement that brought the Monterey Institute of International Studies under affiliation with Middlebury, and began a comprehensive strategic planning process. Liebowitz kicked off The Middlebury Initiative in October 2007; the largest capital campaign ever by a liberal arts college, the Initiative will raise $500 million to support the strategic plan's primary goals of financial aid and additional faculty.

In 2009 Time Magazine named him one of the 10 best college presidents.

On December 12, 2013, Liebowitz announced that he would step down as president of the college effective June 30, 2015. He served at Middlebury College for over 11 years.

On December 17, 2015, Liebowitz announced that he would begin serving in a leadership role at Brandeis University effective July 1, 2016.

In March 2021, Liebowitz accused the Board of Trustees of "trying to force him out of the presidency." However, on April 9, 2021, the Board of Trustees announced a five-year contract extension on Liebowitz's presidency.

References 

1957 births
Living people
Presidents of Middlebury College
Bucknell University alumni
Columbia Graduate School of Arts and Sciences alumni
Middlebury College faculty
People from Middlebury, Vermont
People from Brooklyn
Presidents of Brandeis University